In boardsports, the method grab is a tweaked form of the melon grab; where the rider grabs the heel side of the board in front of the bindings as per Jamie Lynn.

Execution
To perform the method grab, the rider begins by rotating their board 90 degrees to their backside (facing opposite the direction of travel). During or upon the rotation, the rider will grab the center of their board on the heel side. The rider may now revert to a normal position and land.

References

External links
 Melan Grab
 How to Method Grab
 Method - King of Grabs

Skateboarding tricks
Snowboarding tricks